John de Cheam [Cheyam] was a 13th-century English cleric who became Bishop of Glasgow. Before attaining Glasgow, he had previously been the archdeacon of Bath and a papal chaplain. In the summer of 1259, after the quashing of the election of Nicholas de Moffat, Pope Adrian IV provided John to the see, and he was consecrated soon after at the Roman court without any consultation with the Glasgow canons. His election was opposed by King Alexander III of Scotland, who sent a protest to Pope Alexander IV. The pope refused to revoke the decision, but promised to make John render fealty to the king. Bishop John arrived in Scotland in the year 1260. When the mother of the king, Marie de Coucy, fled from her second husband John de Brienne (a.k.a. Jean d'Acre), the Grand Butler of the King of France and the son of John de Brienne, King of Jerusalem, Bishop John was used by King Alexander to reconcile them. Bishop John was one of the witnesses to the Treaty of Perth on 2 July  1266. However, his good relations with the king did not make up for the resentment felt by the Glasgow canons at an outside appointee, and John eventually resigned his see in 1267, and went to France. He died at Meaux the following year, and was buried there.

References
Dowden, John, The Bishops of Scotland, ed. J. Maitland Thomson, (Glasgow, 1912)

13th-century births
1268 deaths
Bishops of Glasgow
13th-century Scottish Roman Catholic bishops
Burials in France
English chaplains
Catholic chaplains
Archdeacons of Bath